Dragoljub Ojdanić (1 June 1941 – 6 September 2020) was a Serbian army general who served as the Chief of the General Staff of the Armed Forces of Yugoslavia and Minister of Defence of Yugoslavia. Ojdanić commanded the Uzice corps during the Bosnian War and was tried and convicted of the deportation and forcible transfer of Kosovo Albanians during the Kosovo War by the ICTY.

Education and career
In 1958, Ojdanić studied at the Yugoslav Military Academy and graduated in 1964. He was deputy commander of the 37th Corps, with command in Užice. He was promoted to Major General on 20 April 1992 and he became the commander of Užice korpus. Under his command, the Užice Corps was deployed in military operations in eastern Bosnia during the war in Bosnia and Herzegovina.

He served as Chief of the General Staff First Army of FRY in 1993 and 1994. From 1994 to 1996, he was commander of the First Army.  In 1996 he became deputy commander Chief of the General Staff. In 1998 Slobodan Milošević placed Ojdanić as a Chief of the General Staff of the Yugoslav Army. He was also a Chief of General Staff during NATO's Operation Allied Force. In February 2000 after the death of defence minister Pavle Bulatović, he was made defence minister of Yugoslavia and promoted to General of the Army.

ICTY trial and sentence
On 25 April 2002, Ojdanić was transferred by the Yugoslav government to the International Criminal Tribunal for the Former Yugoslavia (ICTY) in The Hague. Ojdanić was allowed to attend Milošević's funeral in March 2006. On 26 February 2009, the ICTY sentenced Ojdanić to 15 years in prison, following a conviction for deportation and forcible transfers of Kosovo Albanians.

On 27 May 2009, Ojdanić's case was appealed. Ojdanić's co-counsel on appeal was Peter Robinson of the United States. In January 2013, Ojdanić, publicly admitted his participation in war crimes against Kosovo Albanians and withdrew the appeal against his conviction. On 29 August 2013, Ojdanić was granted early release and afterwards lived in Serbia.

Awards
 Order of Freedom (Yugoslavia)
 Order of Merits for the People 2nd class
 Order of Brotherhood and Unity 2nd class
 Order of the People's Army 2nd class
 Order for Military Merits 2nd class
 Order of the People's Army 3rd class
 Order for Military Merits 3rd class
 Medal for 20 Years of JNA
 Medal for 30 Years of JNA
 Medal for 30 Years of Victory over Fascism
 Medal for 40 Years of JNA
 Medal for 50 Years of JNA (FRY)

References

External links
 Optuznica za ratne zlocine 
 Presuda Haškog suda 

1941 births
2020 deaths
Generals of the Yugoslav People's Army
People convicted by the International Criminal Tribunal for the former Yugoslavia
People extradited from Serbia
Military personnel from Užice
Serbian generals
Serbian people convicted of crimes against humanity